The NXT Women's Championship is a women's professional wrestling championship created and promoted by the American promotion WWE. It is defended on the NXT brand division, the promotion's developmental territory. Introduced on April 5, 2013, the inaugural champion was Paige. The current champion is Roxanne Perez, who is in her first reign.

At the time the title was established, NXT was a developmental territory for WWE. In September 2019, the promotion began promoting NXT as its "third brand" when the NXT television program was moved to the USA Network. Two years later, however, NXT reverted to its original function as WWE's developmental brand. 

In 2020, the NXT Women's Championship became the first and so far only NXT championship to be selected by a Royal Rumble match winner, and subsequently, it became the first and so far only NXT championship to be defended at a WrestleMania at WrestleMania 36. In September 2022, the NXT UK Women's Championship was unified into the NXT Women's Championship.

History 

In June 2012, WWE established NXT as their developmental territory, replacing Florida Championship Wrestling (FCW). The following year on April 5, the NXT Women's Championship was introduced during WrestleMania Axxess. On the May 30 tapings of NXT (aired June 5), WWE's Chief Brand Officer Stephanie McMahon announced that there would be an eight-woman single-elimination tournament, featuring four women from NXT and four from WWE's main roster competing to be crowned the first NXT Women's Champion. During the June 20 tapings of NXT (aired July 24), Paige defeated Emma in the tournament final to become the inaugural champion.

Paige successfully defended her title at Arrival against Emma. Then-NXT General Manager, John "Bradshaw" Layfield, stripped Paige of the title on the April 24, 2014, episode of NXT, as Paige had recently won the WWE Divas Championship, and was in turn promoted to WWE's main roster. A new tournament began the following week. The finals occurred at TakeOver where Charlotte defeated Natalya to win the vacant NXT Women's Championship. On the September 16, 2015, episode of NXT, now NXT General Manager William Regal announced that Bayley would defend her title against Sasha Banks in the main event at TakeOver: Respect on October 7 in the first-ever 30-minute Iron Woman match in WWE history. At the event, Bayley defeated Banks to retain the championship, scoring the win with 3 falls to 2.

Although NXT had been established as WWE's developmental territory, WWE began promoting it as their "third brand" in September 2019 when NXT was moved to the USA Network. This subsequently made the NXT Women's Championship one of the top three singles titles for women in WWE, along with the Raw Women's Championship—which had replaced the Divas title in 2016—and the SmackDown Women's Championship. This was validated in 2020; first, Charlotte Flair (previously known as just Charlotte) won the 2020 Women's Royal Rumble and chose to challenge for the NXT Women's Championship at WrestleMania 36, becoming the first Royal Rumble winner to challenge for an NXT title, and secondly, the title became the first NXT championship to be defended at a WrestleMania where during WrestleMania 36 Part 2, Flair defeated defending champion Rhea Ripley to win her record-tying second NXT Women's Championship. However, WWE revamped NXT in September 2021 and returned the brand to its original function as a developmental territory.

In January 2020, WWE briefly began referring to the women's championship as the "NXT Championship" to bring it on an equal level as the men's title, though reverted to calling it the NXT Women's Championship soon after; it remained as NXT Women's Championship on the official title history during this time.

In August 2022, WWE announced that the NXT UK brand would go on hiatus and would relaunch as NXT Europe in 2023. As such, NXT UK's championship's were unified into their respective NXT championship counterparts. On September 4, 2022, at Worlds Collide, reigning NXT Women's Champion Mandy Rose defeated NXT UK Women's Champion Meiko Satomura and Blair Davenport in a triple threat match to unify the NXT UK Women's Championship into the NXT Women's Championship. Satomura was recognized as the final NXT UK Women's Champion, while Rose went forward as the unified NXT Women's Champion.

Tournaments

Inaugural NXT Women's Championship tournament (2013)

Second NXT Women's Championship tournament (2014) 

</onlyinclude>

<onlyinclude>

Belt design 
The original NXT Women's Championship belt featured an oval shaped silver center plate. At the top of the plate was the WWE logo. The center of the plate was the NXT logo encrusted with pink diamonds; red coloring was behind the letter "X". Above the NXT logo read "Women's" while below the logo read "Champion". There were two side plates, which were skinny and matched the curve of the center plate. The inner side plates were encrusted with pink diamonds, while the outer side plates were blank silver plates. The plates were on a black leather strap. When first introduced, the WWE logo was the long-standing scratch logo but in August 2014, all of WWE's pre-existing championships at the time received a minor update, changing the scratch logo to WWE's current logo that was originally used for the WWE Network.

On April 1, 2017, at WrestleMania Axxess, NXT General Manager William Regal announced that all of the existing NXT title belts at the time would be redesigned. The new title belts were unveiled at TakeOver: Orlando that same night and given to the winners of their respective matches. The redesigned women's championship featured a nearly identical design to the redesigned NXT Championship, including being on a black leather strap, but with a couple of notable differences. The belt was smaller to fit the women. The letters "NXT" on the center plate were silver instead of gold, while the rest of the plate was gold. One other difference was that a banner reading "Women's" was underneath the WWE logo. Coming in line with the majority of WWE's other championship belts, the new design featured side plates with a removable center section that could be customized with the champion's logo; the default plates featured the WWE logo.

On April 2, 2022, during NXT's WrestleMania week event, Stand & Deliver, reigning champion Mandy Rose debuted a new belt design; it is largely similar to the previous version (2017–2022), but the silver behind the logo was replaced by multi-colored paint (matching the NXT 2.0 colorscheme) and the letters "N" and "T" on the center plate were updated to the font style of the NXT 2.0 logo. The default side plates were also updated, replacing the WWE logo with the NXT 2.0 logo. Coming in line with all other women's championships in WWE, the plates are on a white leather strap instead of black.

Reigns 

Paige was the inaugural champion. Asuka is the longest reigning champion at 510 days, beginning on April 1, 2016, and ending on August 24, 2017; however, WWE recognizes the reign as 522 days, with it ending on September 6, 2017, the date the episode in which she vacated the title aired on tape delay. Kairi Sane has the shortest reign at 71 days; however, WWE recognizes Charlotte Flair's second reign as the shortest at 63 days due to tape delay (in reality, Flair held the title for either 73 or 74 days; the exact date that she won the title is unknown). Paige is the youngest champion, winning it at the age of 20, while Shayna Baszler is the oldest, winning the championship at 38. Baszler and Flair are tied for the most reigns at two. Only three women have held the title for a continuous reign of one year (365 days) or more: Asuka, Shayna Baszler, and Mandy Rose.

Roxanne Perez is the current champion in her first reign. She defeated Mandy Rose on the December 13, 2022 episode of NXT in Orlando, Florida.

Notes

See also 
 Women's championships in WWE
 Women in WWE

References

External links 
 Official NXT Women's Championship title history

WWE NXT championships
WWE women's championships